Põhjala Brewery (Estonian: Põhjala pruulikoda) is a craft brewery in Tallinn, Estonia. Its name is Estonian for "northern realm". It is the largest craft brewery in the Baltic states and the only one to have been included in the Ratebeer "top 100" list of world breweries. In 2021 the company had a turnover of 4.61 million euros. Põhjala has a particular focus on porters, barrel ageing, and ingredients from the forests of Estonia.

History
The brewery was founded in 2011 by four Estonian beer enthusiasts, who were soon joined by head brewer Chris Pilkington. The first Põhjala beer, Öö Imperial Baltic Porter, was contract-brewed before the company's original brewery opened in Tallinn's Nõmme district in April 2014.

In 2015 the company opened its first bar "Speakeasy" near Tallinn's main railway station.

In 2018 nearly 4.9 million euros were invested in moving production to a new brewery in the Noblessner area of Tallinn. The average capacity of the brewery is 1,200 hectolitres per month, and 6,000 bottles an hour can be filled on a new bottling line. The facility also houses a laboratory, shop, sauna and taproom with 24 taps.

In 2019 Põhjala opened a pop-up bar in the Chinese capital, Beijing.

In 2021 the brewery sponsored the Põhjala disc golf marathon, with 300 competitors in Jõulumäe, Estonia.

In 2022 Põhjala opened Põhja Konn bar in the Telliskivi area of Tallinn. It serves only Estonian craft beer from Põhjala and other local craft breweries.

Põhjala beers
Põhjala's best-selling beer is Virmalised, an India pale ale which accounts for over a quarter of total production. In addition to a core range of beers, the brewery produces numerous specials and has collaborated with craft brewers such as To Øl, Lervig, De Struise, Jester King and Jing-A Brewing Co. 

The Cellar Series is a range of dark, barrel-aged beers while the Forest Series uses rare botanicals and forest ingredients. Põhjala exported 65 percent of its production in 2021. The main foreign markets were the Netherlands, Finland, France, China, the United Kingdom and the United States.

The brewery has been criticised for producing its Baltic porters using top fermentation, rather than the bottom- or cold fermentation often used for the beer style. In 2020 Põhjala collaborated with Polish brewers Pinta to produce Baltic Pride. It is an imperial Baltic porter, featuring a blend of fresh bottom-fermented Baltic porter and barrel aged top-fermented Baltic porter.

Tallinn Craft Beer Weekend
Tallinn Craft Beer Weekend is an annual craft beer festival organised by Põhjala Brewery, which first took place in 2015. It features over 40 Estonian and international breweries, showcasing over 200 of their beers.

Images of Põhjala Brewery

See also
 Beer in Estonia
 Barrel-aged beer
 Seaplane Harbour Museum - also located in Noblessner Harbour

References

External links
 Meet the brewer: Chris Pilkington, Põhjala.
 Põhjala Brewery Leads Quiet Revolution in Estonian Beer.
 The Baltic Exchange — In Search of Warmth and Porter in Estonia and Denmark.

Beer in Estonia
Food and drink companies of Estonia
Estonian brands
Beer brands
Breweries in Estonia
Companies based in Tallinn